The European and African Zone is one of the three zones of regional Davis Cup competition in 2009.

In the European and African Zone there are four different groups in which teams compete against each other to advance to the next group.

Participating teams

Draw

 and  promoted to Group I in 2010

First Round Matches

Georgia vs. Lithuania

Slovenia vs. Egypt

Latvia vs. Moldova

Hungary vs. Bulgaria

Denmark vs. Finland

Montenegro vs. Monaco

Ireland vs. Algeria

Cyprus vs. Portugal

Play-offs

Georgia vs. Egypt

Moldova vs. Hungary

Denmark vs. Montenegro

Algeria vs. Portugal

Second Round Matches

Lithuania vs. Slovenia

Latvia vs. Bulgaria

Finland vs. Monaco

Ireland vs. Cyprus

Third Round Matches

Slovenia vs. Latvia

Finland vs. Cyprus

External links
Davis Cup draw details

Group II
Davis Cup Europe/Africa Zone